Deposit, New York may refer to:

Deposit (town), New York, in Delaware County 
Deposit (village), New York, located partly within the town to the north and partly in Broome County